The Royal Papworth Hospital NHS Foundation Trust (formerly the Papworth Hospital NHS Foundation Trust) is an NHS foundation trust based in Cambridge, United Kingdom. It runs the Royal Papworth Hospital on the Cambridge Biomedical Campus. The Trust achieved foundation status on 1 July 2004.

References

External links

NHS foundation trusts
Organisations associated with the University of Cambridge